Daniel Watson was a Scottish professional footballer who played in the 1880s and 1890s.

Career
Watson played club football in Scotland and began his career with Dumbarton Athletic.  In the following season, Dumbarton Athletic were to merge with their more successful neighbour, Dumbarton and Watson was one of the few 'Athletic' players who were to step straight into the Dumbarton side.

Honours
Dumbarton
 Scottish League: Champions 1890–1891;1891–92
 Scottish Cup: Runners Up 1890-91
 Dumbartonshire Cup: Winners 1888–89;1889–1890;1890–1891
 League Charity Cup: Winners 1890–91
 1 representative cap for Dumbartonshire in 1890.

References

Scottish footballers
Dumbarton F.C. players
Scottish Football League players
Year of birth missing
Year of death missing
Association footballers not categorized by position